Dismus Onyiego (born 19 November 1945) is a Kenyan former sports shooter. He competed at the 1968 Summer Olympics and the 1972 Summer Olympics.

References

1945 births
Living people
Kenyan male sport shooters
Olympic shooters of Kenya
Shooters at the 1968 Summer Olympics
Shooters at the 1972 Summer Olympics
Commonwealth Games competitors for Kenya
Shooters at the 1974 British Commonwealth Games
People from Nyanza Province